Richard Ward (March 15, 1915 – July 1, 1979) was a gravel-voiced African American actor on the stage, television, and in films, from 1949 until his death. Though best known through his TV appearances late in life, both in sitcoms and police procedurals, Ward also had an extensive film resume and a distinguished stage career, one of the highlights of the latter being his portrayal of Willy Loman in the 1972 production of Death of a Salesman, staged in Baltimore's Center Stage (the first African American production of Arthur Miller's signature opus, produced with the playwright's blessing). Ward's own favorite among his theatrical vehicles was Ceremonies in Dark Old Men.

Life and career
Ward was born in Glenside, Pennsylvania. He worked as a New York City police detective for ten years before beginning his acting career. An Actors Studio alumnus, Ward belatedly made his television debut in 1950 on the Perry Como Show, later appearing on dramatic anthology series such as Playhouse 90, Studio One, and Hallmark Hall of Fame, before becoming a familiar face on seventies sitcoms like Mary Hartman, Mary Hartman, All in the Family and The Jeffersons.

Ward made three guest appearances on Good Times as James's dad Henry (the name that James was known by on Maude), who had walked out on James' mom and siblings when he was younger. The first episode he appeared on, Henry was discovered by Thelma at ship port where he was working and she brought him home to surprise James for his birthday. At first, James didn't want to see him, but after a deep conversation, Henry was welcomed by his son to join the celebration. James wished he could have 100 more years with his dad. The other two episodes Henry appeared on were after James' death.

On Sanford and Son, Ward appeared in the episode "The Stung" (1975); in it, Fred asks a professional gambler (played by Ward) to teach Lamont and his friends a lesson. In the pilot film for the cop show, Starsky & Hutch, Ward played Captain Dobey, though in the series itself that role was played by Bernie Hamilton. Ward did appear as a different character in one episode in the final series, shortly before his death due to a heart attack.

Filmography

References

External links

Richard Ward papers, 1949–1980, held by the Billy Rose Theatre Division, New York Public Library for the Performing Arts
, includes image

1915 births
1979 deaths
American male film actors
American male television actors
African-American male actors
Male actors from Philadelphia
20th-century American male actors
People from Cheltenham, Pennsylvania
American police officers
Actors Studio alumni
20th-century African-American people